God's Crucible is a lost 1917 silent film drama directed by Lynn Reynolds and starring Myrtle Gonzalez. It was produced by Bluebird Photoplays and released by Universal Film Manufacturing Company.

Cast
George Hernandez as Lorenzo Todd
Val Paul as Warren Todd
Fred Montague as Dudley Phillips (*as Frederick Montague)
Myrtle Gonzalez as Virginia Phillips
Jack Curtis as Oracle Jack
Ed Brady as Wilkins (*as Edward J. Brady)
Frankie Lee as Bobby (*as Francis Lee)
Harry Griffith as Ira Todd (as Harvey Griffith)

References

External links
God's Crucible at IMDb.com

1917 films
American silent feature films
American black-and-white films
Films directed by Lynn Reynolds
Universal Pictures films
Silent American drama films
1917 drama films
Lost American films
1917 lost films
Lost drama films
1910s American films